Vladas Drėma (born in Riga on 3 December 1910 – died in Vilnius on 4 January 1995) was one of the most prominent Lithuanian art historians, critics, and art conservation specialists. He is also a known artist. One of the most remembered publications of Vladas Drėma's  is Dingęs Vilnius (Lost Vilnius, published in 1991).

Biography

In 1926–1931 Drėma attended an art studio run by Vytautas Kairiūkštis. After graduating from the Stefan Batory University in 1936, Drėma continued his studies in Warsaw. From 1932 he lectured in various schools. He founded Vilnius group, that involved Lithuanian, Polish and Jewish artists. At first Drėma's works were influenced by cubism and constructivism.

In 1945 he was invited to become director of Ethnography Museum. Drėma held this position until 1946. He lectured in Vilnius University until 1948 and in Lithuanian Art Institute until 1970. In 1992 Drėma was awarded an honorary degree of Vilnius Academy of Fine Arts. He maintained active and long-term correspondence with Stanisław Lorentz about Vilnius art history, and heritage, that was published in 1998.

Notable publications
Pranciškus Smuglevičius. Vaga, 1976
Dingęs Vilnius. Vaga, 1991. 
Vilniaus Šv. Jono bažnyčia. R. Pakalnio leidykla, 1997. 
LDK miestai ir miesteliai (posthumously). Versus aureus, 2006. 
 Kanutas Ruseckas. — Vilnius: Vilniaus dailės akademijos leidykla, 1996. — 287 с. —  (лит.)

References

External links 
 Virtuali paroda „Valdui Drėmai – 100“ (Martynas Mažvydas National Library of Lithuania) (Lithuanian)

1910 births
1995 deaths
Burials at Antakalnis Cemetery
20th-century Lithuanian historians
Vilnius University alumni
Academic staff of Vilnius University
Conservator-restorers
Recipients of the Lithuanian National Prize
Directors of museums in Lithuania
Academic staff of the Vilnius Academy of Arts
Soviet historians